"Theme from The Greatest American Hero (Believe It or Not)" is a song composed by Mike Post with lyrics by Stephen Geyer, and sung by American singer Joey Scarbury. It serves as the theme song for the 1980s television series The Greatest American Hero. The track was later included on Scarbury's 1981 debut album America's Greatest Hero.

The theme song became a popular hit during the run of The Greatest American Hero. "Believe It or Not" entered the top 40 of the Billboard Hot 100 on June 13, 1981, eventually peaking at No. 2 during the weeks ending August 15–22, 1981, kept off the top spot by "Endless Love" by Diana Ross and Lionel Richie, and spending a total of 18 weeks in the top 40. On the Adult Contemporary chart, "Believe It or Not" went to number 3. It also peaked at the number one position on the Record World chart.

In the season 8 episode of Seinfeld titled "The Susie", an answering machine message consists of a parody of "Believe It or Not". As a tribute to the Seinfeld episode, the song appeared in a 2021 TV commercial for Tide that aired during CBS' telecast of Super Bowl LV on February 7, 2021 starring Jason Alexander, whose character George Costanza recorded the parody lyrics as his answering machine message.

Chart history

Weekly charts

Year-end charts

Certifications and sales

References

1981 singles
1981 songs
American soft rock songs
Cashbox number-one singles
Elektra Records singles
Glen Campbell songs
Joey Scarbury songs
Number-one singles in New Zealand
Song recordings produced by Mike Post
Television drama theme songs
The Greatest American Hero